Svein Are Andreassen (born 3 July 1968) is a Norwegian former footballer who played as a forward.

Career
He was born in Stokmarknes, lived in Tromsø from age one to seven before the family settled in Harstad. He played youth football for Kilkameratene and Harstad IL, and made his first-team debut for Harstad around 1986. From 1990 to 1995 he played for Tromsø IL.

He never fully broke into the first team, and resumed his career at Sogndal in 1996–1997 and Lillestrøm in 1998. For the remained of the 1998–99 season he played for Portsmouth in England. After the season concluded he gave up on professional football, following multiple injuries and twenty-two surgeries. He did however feature for Harstad IL.

References

1968 births
Living people
People from Harstad
Norwegian footballers
Harstad IL players
Tromsø IL players
Sogndal Fotball players
Lillestrøm SK players
Eliteserien players
Norwegian First Division players
Portsmouth F.C. players
Norwegian expatriate footballers
Norwegian expatriate sportspeople in England
Expatriate footballers in England
Norwegian expatriates in England
Association football forwards
Sportspeople from Troms og Finnmark